Victor Lake Provincial Park is a provincial park in British Columbia, Canada, located southwest of Revelstoke to the north of Three Valley Lake (just west of the summit of Eagle Pass).

References

Columbia Country
Provincial parks of British Columbia
Monashee Mountains